The "Always Ready, Always There!" refers to the official organizational march of the United States National Guard and the National Guard Bureau. It also serves as the component song of the Army and Air National Guard. It was composed in 2016 by Chief Warrant Officer 4 David Myers, director of the 40th Army Band in the Vermont Army National Guard. It replaced I Guard America, which was adopted in November 1999. Although the NGB March represents the Army and Air National Guard among the songs of agencies in the Department of Defense, it does not replace either The Army Goes Rolling Along or The U.S. Air Force, which are the service songs of the United States Army and the United States Air Force respectively. Instead, the march is played immediately after their respective service song is played at official ceremonies.

Lyrics

Videos 

 Always Ready, Always There on YouTube

References 

2016 songs
American music
American military marches
National Guard (United States)
United States Army National Guard
United States Air National Guard